American High School (AHS) is a public secondary school located in Fremont, California, United States. It is one of five public high schools within the Fremont Unified School District. The school receives its students through the American High School attendance area boundary set by the district.  It was a California Distinguished School from 2005 to 2009 and a California Gold Ribbon School from 2017 to 2019. It was recognized as a California Distinguished School once again in 2019. Most of the school body is Asian, with a significant South and East Asian population.

Notable alumni
 James Cannida, NFL football player
 Yousef Erakat, Youtuber - Fouseytube
 Robert Flynn, lead vocalist/rhythm guitarist/founder of heavy metal band Machine Head.
 Michelle Go, Asian American woman pushed off of train platform in 2022.
 Steve Lewis, 400m runner who won three gold medals at the 1988 and 1992 Summer Olympics
 Garry Tan, venture capitalist and entrepreneur
 Len Wiseman, filmmaker
 Joel Souza, filmmaker

References in pop culture
"American High," the eighth track from Machine Head's 2001 album Supercharger, references American High School, the alma mater of its lead singer.

Demographics 
Student enrollment in 2021 was approximately 2,544 students. Their ethnic makeup was:
73.0% Asian
11.2% White
9.0% Hispanic
3.6% Two or more races
2.2% African American
0.7% Pacific Islander
0.3% American Indian

5.4% of students were English language learners.

References

External links 

 

Educational institutions established in 1972
Fremont Unified School District
High schools in Alameda County, California
Schools in Fremont, California
Public high schools in California
1972 establishments in California